Atheistic Dictionary is a one-volume reference work devoted to various aspects of religion and atheism. It contains more than 2500 terms.

History of creation 
The dictionary was the result of many years of cooperation of scientists from various scientific and educational institutions of the USSR and the socialist countries. It was based on the word list, compiled by the candidate of historical sciences V.F. Zybkovets with V.V. Zybkovets, which has been widely discussed by the scientific community of Moscow, Leningrad and Kiev — Institute of Scientific Atheism Academy of Social Sciences under the CPSU Central Committee and its Kiev branch, Department of history and theory of scientific atheism, Moscow State University named after Lomonosov, Department of history and theory of scientific atheism KSU named after Taras Shevchenko, Department of scientific atheism, ethics and aesthetics Herzen University. The final wordlist was I. N. Yablokov.

References

Literature

External links 
  

Books about atheism
Dictionaries by subject
1983 non-fiction books
Anti-religious campaign in the Soviet Union